This is a list of diplomatic missions in The Bahamas.  At present, the capital city of Nassau hosts six embassies.  Several countries have resident honorary consuls to provide emergency services to their citizens, while others accredit ambassadors from neighbouring countries or their permanent missions to the United Nations in New York City.

Embassies/High Commissions in Nassau

Non-resident Embassies/High Commissions

Resident in Havana, Cuba

 
 
 

 
 
 
 
 
 
 
 
 
 
 

 
 
 
 
 

Resident in Kingston, Jamaica

 
 
 
 

 
 
 
 
 
 
 

Resident in Ottawa, Canada

 
 

 
 

 

Resident in Washington, D.C., United States of America

 
 
 
 
 
 
 
 
 

 

 
 

 
 
 

Resident in New York City, United States of America'''

 

 
 
 
 
 
 
 
 
 
 
 
 
 

 

 
 

Resident in other cities

 (St. John's)
 (Port-of-Spain)
 (Bridgetown)
 (St. George's)
 (Georgetown)
 (Port-of-Spain)
 (St. George's)
 (Georgetown)
 (Port-of-Spain)
 (Mexico City)
 (Oslo)
 (Santo Domingo)
 (Miami)
 (Mexico City)
 (Santo Domingo)

See also
 Foreign relations of the Bahamas
 List of diplomatic missions of the Bahamas
 Visa requirements for Bahamian citizens

Notes

References

Nassau Diplomatic List

Foreign relations of the Bahamas
Bahamas
Diplomatic missions